A list of films produced in Spain in 1984 (see 1984 in film).

1984

External links
 Spanish films of 1984 at the Internet Movie Database

1984
Spanish
Films